The women's synchronized trampoline competition in trampoline gymnastics at the 2009 World Games took place on 22 July 2009 at the Kaohsiung in Kaohsiung Arena, Chinese Taipei.

Competition format
A total of 11 pairs entered the competition. Best 8 duets from preliminary advances to the final. Only one pair from the same country may advance to the final.

Results

Preliminary

Final

References

External links
 Results on IWGA website

Trampoline gymnastics at the 2009 World Games